Rio Secco Golf Club is a public golf course located in the Seven Hills neighborhood of Henderson, in the Las Vegas Valley. The course has hosted the annual Tiger Woods Jam and other charity and competitive events including the VegasGolfer Pro Showdown. It is owned and operated by Vici Properties.

History
Rio Secco Golf Club was designed and built in 1997 by golf course architect Rees Jones for the Rio All Suite Hotel and Casino. When Rio Secco opened in 1997, Golf Digest and Golf Magazine voted it among the top ten new public courses. Rio Secco features six holes through steep canyons, six holes on a plateau overlooking the city and six holes in a broad desert mountain range. The range is 5778 to 7332 feet. The Rio was purchased by Harrah's Entertainment (later Caesars Entertainment) in 1998. The golf club was included in the 2017 spin-off of Vici Properties from Caesars.

References

External links
 

1997 establishments in Nevada
Buildings and structures in Henderson, Nevada
Golf clubs and courses in Nevada
Golf in Las Vegas
Organizations based in Henderson, Nevada
Sports in Henderson, Nevada
Sports venues in Las Vegas